Tro-Bro Léon is a professional cycle road race held in Finistère, Brittany. The event was first run in 1984 as an amateur race before becoming a professional race since 2000. The race was established in 2005 as a 1.1 event on the UCI Europe Tour. In 2020, the event joined the UCI ProSeries in its inaugural edition, although the cancellation of the 2020 edition meant that the inaugural event was held in 2021.

Ribinoù 
Tro-Bro Léon is often called Le Petit Paris–Roubaix or The Hell of the West due to its similarities with Paris–Roubaix, because Tro-Bro Léon includes around two dozen sections of ribinoù, which longtime race director Jean-Paul Mellouët described as a variety of farm tracks and unpaved roads on the rolling and windy roads of Brittany that can feature cobblestones, dirt paths, and/or gravel.  The rider who crosses the line first and the best placed Breton rider each receive a piglet.

Winners

References

External links
  

 
UCI Europe Tour races
Cycle races in France
Recurring sporting events established in 1984
1984 establishments in France